White Fang is a 1925 American silent Western film directed by Laurence Trimble and featuring Theodore von Eltz, Ruth Dwyer, and Matthew Betz. It was produced by FBO Pictures as a starring vehicle for Strongheart, an Alsatian who appeared in a number of films during the decade. It is based on the 1906 novel White Fang by Jack London.

Plot
As described in a film magazine review, Joe Holland, superintendent of the Lucky 13 mine, saves his sick friend Weadon Scott from a pack of wolves. He discovers that someone is stealing gold ore from the mine. Frank Wilde, one of the foremen, buys White Fang, a man killing dog. He enters him into a dog fight match against Cherokee, a bull dog. White Fang is rescued when Weadon enters. Holland's daughter Mollie marries Frank. She then discovers that her husband is stealing gold ore from her father's mine. Her husband then kills Joe Holland and beats up Weadon when White Fang comes rushing in. White Fang kills the villain. With her now a widow, Weadon marries Mollie.

Cast

References

Bibliography
 Connelly, Robert B. The Silents: Silent Feature Films, 1910-36, Volume 40, Issue 2. December Press, 1998.
 Goble, Alan. The Complete Index to Literary Sources in Film. Walter de Gruyter, 1999.
 Munden, Kenneth White. The American Film Institute Catalog of Motion Pictures Produced in the United States, Part 1. University of California Press, 1997.

External links

1925 films
1925 Western (genre) films
1920s English-language films
American silent feature films
Silent American Western (genre) films
Films directed by Laurence Trimble
American black-and-white films
Film Booking Offices of America films
Films based on White Fang
1920s American films